Albert Luke Ireland (February 25, 1918 – November 16, 1997) was a United States Marine Corps staff sergeant. Serving in both World War II and the Korean War, Ireland earned the Purple Heart medal nine times for wounds in combat, the most of any U.S. Marine in history.

Ireland was born and lived in Putnam County, New York. After briefly serving in the Royal Canadian Air Force, he joined the U.S. Marine Corps in 1941 following the Attack on Pearl Harbor, and served in the Pacific theater during World War II. Ireland took part in the Battles of Guadalcanal and Okinawa, earning five Purple Hearts before the surrender of Japan. In fall 1950, he volunteered for active duty in the Korean War, leading an infantry unit and earning a further four Purple Hearts.

Ireland concluded his military service in 1953, and worked as a teacher in New York City. He was also active in several veteran organizations. In 1979, the New York City Police formally recognized him for rescuing a student from a mugging. In his later years, Ireland lived in Kansas, and died in 1997. He was buried in a memorial service in Cold Spring, New York.

Military career

Canadian Air Force service 
In 1941, Ireland enlisted in the Royal Canadian Air Force (RCAF), beginning his military career. At the time, the United States had not yet entered the Second World War. Ireland wanted to become a fighter pilot, but a sinus problem prevented him; he spent only nine months in the RCAF, concluding his service in November 1941. "After a few times in the air," he later remarked, "they discovered my sinus condition."

World War II Marine Corps service 
Five days after Pearl Harbor, Ireland joined the U.S. Marines. He spent 27 months overseas during World War II, serving as a machine gunner. He was wounded first in the Guadalcanal Campaign, on January 23, 1943, when two pieces of shrapnel penetrated his back and lodged in his left lung, and four more times in the Battle of Okinawa. He also contracted malaria during the Guadalcanal Campaign. His first Okinawa wound, shrapnel in the leg and right arm, occurred on April 16, 1945. On May 22, shrapnel struck him again, and on May 23, shrapnel hit his face. His final Okinawa wound was a sniper's bullet to the face on June 12, 1945, when two teeth were shot out. All his Okinawa wounds occurred on Sugar Loaf Hill, where he served with the 1st Battalion, 4th Marines, 6th Marine Division. As a result of his WWII injuries, Ireland received five Purple Hearts. Still carrying shrapnel in his lung, he returned to the United States in 1945 with full disability, spending a year as a Veterans Administration patient. Doctors suggested surgery to remove half of his lung, but he refused the operation. He traveled to Arizona and, eventually, his lungs improved. Remarking on his recovery, Ireland later said: "I was only 40% disabled and the doctors said it was a miracle. I still have that piece of shrapnel in my lung."

Korean War 

Ireland became a Marine Corps Reservist after the end of World War II, and attended the School of Health and Education at Ithaca College between 1948 and 1949. He also attended the University of Arizona and the University of Notre Dame, entering the Notre Dame physical education school with plans of becoming a coach. He volunteered for active duty in the fall of 1950 after the outbreak of the Korean War, completing refresher combat training at Camp Lejeune in early January 1951 and applying for combat duty. However, because Ireland had received more than two Purple Hearts, the first sergeant there who was creating the list of Marines to be sent to Korea attempted to prevent him from going to combat. On October 23, 1950, the Marine Corps had made a regulation that any Marine suffering two or more wounds in World War II or Korea was to be removed from fighting. The first sergeant, however, was overruled after Ireland appealed to the Commandant of the Marine Corps, General Clifton B. Cates, in Washington, D.C. After "two days of talking and waiting," Ireland was allowed to go fighting, and by January 7, 1951, was en route to the West Coast "preparatory to joining his Marine buddies" in the Korean War. General Cates was later quoted in Time magazine as stating: "If the sergeant wants to fight, let him fight." At the time, Ireland held the rank of corporal. His mother, Katherine, at first objected when he wanted to fight again, but as Ireland told the press: "I explained to her we had another job to do and it would take a lot of men," and this changed her mind. The Associated Press reported on Ireland's efforts to return to combat duty, and The New York Times printed the story also.
Ireland was flown from Washington to San Francisco en route to Korea. In Korea, he led an infantry rocket unit. He was a squad leader with Company I, 3rd Battalion, 5th Marines. On September 26, 1951, Ireland's patrol was ambushed by North Korean soldiers while searching for a break in the communication line; he ordered his men to take cover and, "expressing complete disregard for his personal safety," he "fearlessly crawled toward the hostile troops." Then, "with grenades and rifle fire," Ireland "single-handedly killed several of the enemy and forced the remainder to withdraw,” remaining in his position while the wiremen fixed the communication line. For this action, he won the Bronze Star. 
In December 1951, after he had suffered shrapnel to the neck and mortar fragments to the face, the Marine Corps decided to ship him home, despite his continued desire to serve in combat. His final wound, shrapnel to the eye and face on December 29, 1951, was severe enough for him to be medically discharged. His other Korean wounds occurred on June 2, July 2, and July 7, 1951. He also suffered frostbite in Korea. Ireland earned four Purple Hearts as a result of his Korean War wounds.

End of military service 
In 1953, Ireland was honorably discharged from the Marine Corps after being wounded in the leg, hand, neck and face in Korea, concluding his twelve years of military service. Ireland's military awards also include two Bronze Star Medals—with Combat "V" device—and campaign and service medals with eight battle stars. During his military career, he required five blood transfusions.

In July 1953, Time magazine published a piece on Ireland entitled "Fighting Man," detailing his military career, Purple Heart awards, and appeal to General Cates to allow him to fight in Korea. On July 27, 1953, the day the Korean Armistice was signed, the New York Daily News reported his remarks on the event: "If it's real, I feel great and so will the guys up at the front. I hope there's no mickey in it, though." In September 1953, the St. Louis Post-Dispatch reported on him meeting Secretary of the Navy Robert B. Anderson. Ireland was speaking at an American Legion convention banquet in St. Louis. Lewis K. Gough, national commander of the American Legion, was also present. The Post-Dispatch described Ireland as "America's most wounded veteran." At age 47, Ireland again volunteered to serve in the Vietnam War, but this time, the Marine Corps refused.

Personal life

Ireland was born in Nelsonville, New York, on February 25, 1918, the son of Albert Ireland and Katherine McGee Ireland. He was a longtime resident of both Nelsonville and nearby Cold Spring. He attended Haldane High School in Cold Spring. His military Report of Separation states that before joining the Marines in World War II, his employer was the Hudson River Stone Corp. of Cold Spring. The separation report following his Korean service listed his main civilian occupation as a reporter for the Putnam County News. His brother, Francis J. Ireland, served in the U.S. Army during World War II.

At age 36, Ireland won the Notre Dame University bantamweight boxing championship. In 1956, he graduated Ithaca College with a Bachelor of Science degree, having become sports editor of the college yearbook and a member of Phi Epsilon Kappa. Ireland was a lifetime member of the Cold Spring Fire Department. A section of New York State Route 301 was named after him on August 20, 2002. On May 14, 2015, the Putnam County Sheriff's Department christened one of their Marine Patrol Boats the SPB Albert L. Ireland; a 24-foot 2013 Boston Whaler, the boat patrolled the Hudson River until the county ended river patrols in 2021.

Teaching career, coaching, and veteran organizations 
Ireland was a teacher and coach for the New York City Board of Education, and a member of both the Military Order of the Purple Heart and American Legion. He also founded the Marine Corps League unit in the city of Poughkeepsie, New York, and was elected commandant of the league's New York department in July 1965. On June 29, 1979, The New York Times reported that the New York City Police Department had recognized Ireland for a "distinguished" act of public service, when he came to the rescue of a student "being mugged by three men," who were later arrested. At the time, Ireland was a teacher at the High School of Art and Design in Manhattan. He coached judo, wrestling, and boxing at the school, and taught science. Ireland was seriously harmed in the mugging incident, which had occurred in November 1976 when he was 58 years old; the details of the attack were explained in the December 26, 1976 issue of the Poughkeepsie Journal. The paper described how Ireland was "assaulted from behind" as he "tried to break up a mugging in the school area," receiving a "cerebral concussion, possible brain damage, post-concussion syndromes and back and neck injuries." He gave an interview to the press from the Castle Point Veterans Affairs hospital, and expressed doubt he would ever be able to return to coaching judo, but felt confident he could continue with boxing and wrestling. Ireland coached the Art and Design school's under-equipped wrestling team to the NYC Public School Athletic Wrestling Championship, and while "plagued by the lack of practice facilities," the Art and Design team defeated twenty-two other squads and won the championship. Ireland also taught at the Bay Ridge High School in Brooklyn, where he likewise taught science. He ultimately spent over two decades as a teacher.

Later years and death 
In his later years, Ireland lived in Kansas. He moved to Great Bend, Kansas from Dodge City in 1991, and died in Larned on November 16, 1997, at the Central Kansas Medical Center, Saint Joseph Campus. He was interred in the Cold Spring Cemetery, in Cold Spring, NY, next to his mother and father during a Saturday, November 13, 2004 memorial service attended by about 75 people; his remains had been held by family members since his death. Declining to bury him at Arlington National Cemetery, the family instead chose to lay him to rest in his hometown. The following Monday, Cold Spring Mayor Anthony Phillips gave an interview, stating: "I am very grateful to the family for allowing him to be placed in our community. It was important." Phillips had first contacted the family several years earlier, hoping they would agree to return Ireland home for burial. New York State Senator Vincent Leibell, III and Assemblywoman Sandra Galef were present at Ireland's memorial service, along with "United States Marines from Stewart Air Force Base, including a firing squad."

Military awards and decorations

References

1918 births
1997 deaths
United States Marine Corps personnel of World War II
United States Marine Corps personnel of the Korean War
Royal Canadian Air Force personnel of World War II
People from Putnam County, New York
United States Marine Corps non-commissioned officers
Military personnel from New York (state)